Mahmoud Samir is an Egyptian footballer who plays for the Egyptian team El Dakhleya.

He scored his debut goal with Al Ahly against ASEC Mimosas in CAF Champions League 2008.

References

External links
 Mahmoud Samir Profile At footballdatabase.eu

1983 births
Living people
Egyptian footballers
Football (soccer) midfielders
Tersana SC players
Al Ahly SC players
Al Masry SC players
Al Ittihad Alexandria Club players
Egyptian Premier League players